Austruca is a genus of indo-west Pacific fiddler crabs in the family Ocypodidae. There are about 13 described species in this genus.

Austruca was formerly a subgenus of Uca, but in 2016 it was elevated in rank to genus.

Species
These 13 species belong to the genus Austruca:

 Austruca albimana (Kossmann, 1877) (white-handed fiddler crab)
 Austruca annulipes (H.Milne Edwards, 1837) (ring-legged fiddler crab)
 Austruca bengali (bengal fiddler crab)
 Austruca citrus (citrus fiddler crab)
 Austruca cryptica (Naderloo, Türkay & Chen, 2010) (cryptic fiddler crab)
 Austruca iranica (Pretzmann, 1971) (Iranian fiddler crab)
 Austruca lactea (De Haan, 1835) (milky fiddler crab)
 Austruca mjoebergi (Rathbun, 1924) (banana fiddler crab)
 Austruca occidentalis (Naderloo, Schubart & Shih, 2016) (East African fiddler crab)
 Austruca perplexa (H.Milne Edwards, 1852) (perplexing fiddler crab)
 Austruca sindensis (Alcock, 1900) (indus fiddler crab)
 Austruca triangularis (A.Milne-Edwards, 1873) (triangular fiddler crab)
 Austruca variegata (Heller, 1862) (motley fiddler crab)

References

Ocypodoidea